Hans Loch (2 November 1898 in Cologne – 13 July 1960 in Berlin) was Chairman of the Liberal Democratic Party of Germany and Finance Minister of the German Democratic Republic.

Life 
After his secondary education Loch was drafted for military service in 1917. From 1918 to 1923 he studied law at the Universities of Cologne and Bonn and then worked as a legal adviser and tax counsellor. In 1936 he emigrated to the Netherlands, but returned to Germany in 1938 and from 1939 to 1945 was a soldier of the Wehrmacht.

In 1945 Loch was a co-founder of the Liberal Democratic Party in the district of Gotha. From 1947 he was Chairman of the municipal policy subcommittee of the Central Board, and from 1949 deputy chairman of the party. In 1951 he became party chairman, first jointly with Karl Hamann, and then alone, following the arrest of the latter in December  1952.

From 1946 to 1948 he was mayor of Gotha, then until 1950 Minister of Justice of Thuringia, and then till 1955 Minister of Finance of the GDR. As finance minister, he was a member of the Council of Ministers. From 1949 he was a member of the (provisional) Volkskammer (People's Chamber), from 1950 Vice Chairman of the Council of Ministers and from 1954 a member of the Presidium of the National Council of the National Front.

In 1954 Loch was awarded the Patriotic Order of Merit.

Written works 
 Ein Bürger sieht die Sowjetunion, Leipzig 1953
 Auf seltsamen Pfaden. Streifzüge durch das Russland von gestern und heute, Berlin 1955
 In eine neue Epoche. Ein Buch für den Mittelstand, Berlin 1958
 Von der Elbe bis zum Gelben Meer, Berlin 1958
 Wir sind dabei gewesen, Berlin 1959

Sources 

Wer war wer in der DDR?

External links 

 
 Lebenslauf Hans Lochs

1898 births
1960 deaths
Politicians from Cologne
People from the Rhine Province
Liberal Democratic Party of Germany politicians
Finance ministers of East Germany
Government ministers of East Germany
Members of the Provisional Volkskammer
Members of the 1st Volkskammer
Members of the 2nd Volkskammer
Members of the 3rd Volkskammer
Mayors of places in Thuringia
German military personnel of World War I
German military personnel of World War II
Recipients of the Patriotic Order of Merit in gold
Recipients of the Banner of Labor